Every Good Boy Deserves Fudge is the second studio album by the grunge band Mudhoney. It was recorded in 1991, at a time when the band was thinking of signing to a major record label, but decided to release the album on Sub Pop. The album shipped 50,000 copies on its original release. It is credited with helping to keep Sub Pop in business.

Guitarist Steve Turner has said that the album is his "favorite Mudhoney album as a whole."

There is an alternate version of "Check-Out Time" on the Let It Slide EP.

Production
The album was recorded on low-quality tape via an 8-track desk. It is named after a mnemonic used by music students to recall the notes (EGBDF) on the lines of the treble clef.

Critical reception
Entertainment Weekly wrote: "Imagine the heaviest of Black Sabbath heavy metal, only somewhat speeded up and with added touches of humor, and you have a good approximation of the Mudhoney way of life." Trouser Press wrote that "Conrad Uno’s dry 8-track production sharpens Mudhoney’s garage-rock edge — evident in Arm’s fuzzed-out vocals and a shared fondness for second-hand blues progressions — enough to stand apart from the watered-down metal of most flannel merchants, but they don’t go anywhere with it." The Spin Alternative Record Guide called the album "charming," writing that a "revitalized sense of hooks connect Mudhoney more directly back to '60s garage."

Along with the band's debut EP Superfuzz Bigmuff, the album was included in 1001 Albums You Must Hear Before You Die, with reviewer Jason Chow calling it "a classic album, one of the best of the genre."

Track listing

Personnel
 Mark Arm - vocals, guitar, organ
 Steve Turner - electric guitar, harmonica
 Matt Lukin - bass guitar
 Dan Peters - drums
 Conrad Uno - producer

Charts

References

1991 albums
Mudhoney albums
Sub Pop albums
Albums produced by Conrad Uno
Au Go Go Records albums